Economic and Financial Committee may refer to:
United Nations General Assembly Second Committee ("Economic and Financial Committee")
Economic and Financial Committee (European Union)
Economic and Financial Affairs Council (Council of the European Union)